George Oliver Darrow (July 7, 1903 – March 24, 1983) was a professional baseball player.  He was a left-handed pitcher for one season (1934) with the Philadelphia Phillies.  For his career, he compiled a 2–6 record, with a 5.51 earned run average, and 14 strikeouts in 49 innings pitched.

An alumnus of Washburn University, he was born in Beloit, Kansas and died in Sun City, Arizona at the age of 79.

External links

1903 births
1983 deaths
Philadelphia Phillies players
Major League Baseball pitchers
Baseball players from Kansas
Oklahoma City Indians players
Pueblo Braves players
San Antonio Indians players
Galveston Buccaneers players
Baltimore Orioles (IL) players
Oakland Oaks (baseball) players
Birmingham Barons players
Portland Beavers players
Hollywood Stars players
Washburn Ichabods baseball players
People from Beloit, Kansas